Ingle is a surname. Notable people with the surname include:

Brendan Ingle (1940–2018), Irish boxer
Christofer Drew Ingle (born 1991), American acoustic pop musician
Doug Ingle (born 1945), American rock musician
Dwight Ingle (1907–1978), American physiologist and endocrinologist
James Addison Ingle (1867–1903), American missionary to China
John Ingle (1928–2012), American actor
John Stuart Ingle (1933–2010), American painter
Phillip Ingle (1961–1995), American murderer
Reggie Ingle (1903–1992), English cricketer and lawyer
Richard Ingle (1609–1653), English colonial seaman, ship captain, tobacco trader, privateer, and pirate 
Sophie Ingle (born 1991), Welsh association football player
William Ingle (1828–1870), 19th century British sculptor
William Ingle (cricketer) (1856–1899), New Zealand cricketer

See also
Ingles (surname)

Ethnonymic surnames